Alief Elsik High School is a  high school in the Alief region of Houston, Texas, United States.

Elsik is divided into two campuses: the main campus (12601 High Star in Houston, zip code 77072), and the Alief Elsik Ninth Grade Center (located at 6767 South Dairy Ashford, city of Houston, 77072), which serves ninth graders. Both campuses, which are in the Alief Independent School District, serve grades 9 through 12. The ninth grade campus is located in the International District although the main high school building is outside of it.

The school's mascot is a ram, and the school's basketball and football teams are well known throughout Texas, as is the speech and debate team. The school is considered to have the best speech and debate team in all of Houston, placing in the top ten qualifiers in the state of Texas as well as sweepstakes winners in the NFL state tournament. The academic teams at Alief Elsik - Academic Decathlon, Star Academic Challenge, and various UIL organizations - participate in regional, state, and national competitions.

Alief Hastings High School sits adjacent to Elsik, and is considered to be its brother school. The two schools enjoy a friendly rivalry that heats up each year in the final football game when they play each other in a shared football stadium.

Alief's three traditional high schools, Elsik, Hastings, and the more recent Alief Taylor High School, now follow a seven period schedule. On Monday through Friday there are 50 minute classes, with an hour-and-thirty-minute lunch period (5th period). Wednesdays have 40 minutes of class time, which is used to give teachers a meeting day after school. This has been in effect since the 2007-2008 school year began.

Currently, Elsik has a night school, much like its fellow Alief high schools.

AP and Honors classes are graded on a 5.0 grading scale, while all other classes are graded on a 4.0 scale. Dual credit programs for US History are offered for juniors, and English, Sociology, Government, and Economics are also offered to seniors.

In 2019, Elsik received a C grade from the Texas Education Agency.

History

Elsik opened in 1975 on the same campus as Hastings High School, as what is now known as Hastings South. The first year Elsik only enrolled freshmen, and added classes every year thereafter, until it had all four grades, with the first freshman class from 1975-76 graduating in 1979. While the two schools were divided by a large courtyard and bus run, there was frequent contact with students from the other campus, which made for interesting times during sporting events between the two schools. Certain classes were shared by both Hastings and Elsik, such as machine shop, art, and Accelerated Learning or "Honor Roll" classes.

A separate school building partially opened in January, 1982 one block away from Hastings. The original portions were known at the time as the North House and the C Building. The remainder of the building, known as the South House, opened in January, 1983. During the construction of the South House, temporary walls existed in the South Cafeteria and classroom wing, dividing the completed portion of the building from that portion still under construction. Even after the new building was complete, certain classes and sporting facilities were shared between the two schools.

In the late 1980s, a separate building was built bridging the two schools on land formerly used for physical education. This new building was almost like a separate school and included its own cafeteria. It mainly filled the need for shared classes in one centralized, easily accessible location for students. It is known as the Annex. Elsik High School is one of the largest high schools in the state.

Academics
For the 2018-2019 school year, the school received a C grade from the Texas Education Agency, with an overall score of 79 out of 100. The school received a C grade in two domains, Student Achievement (score of 76) and Closing the Gaps (score of 75), and a B grade in School Progress (score of 81). The school did not receive any of the seven possible distinction designations.

Demographics
In the 2018-2019 school year, there were 4,266 students. 27.7% were African American, 10.2% were Asian, 59.2% were Hispanic, 0.2% were Pacific Islander, 2.4% were White, and 0.3% were two or more races. 78.6% of students were Economically Disadvantaged, 23.8% were English Language Learners, and 6.5% received Special Education services.

Feeder patterns
All Alief ISD elementary, intermediate, and middle schools feed into Elsik, as high school placement in Alief ISD is determined by a lottery: the lottery can result in either Elsik, Hastings, or Taylor. If a student was selected by lottery to attend a high school different from the high school of a relative currently attending or graduated from, the student may opt to transfer to that respective school. Students may also complete an application for the district's magnet high school, Kerr.

The lottery system was originally developed to create balanced demographics in Alief's high schools when it was found that there was no simple geographic method of dividing the school district that would be fair and equitable. As a result of the lottery, the demographics of Alief's high schools are virtually identical. However, it is common that neighbors who had attended the same elementary and middle schools must instead go to different high schools. Alief's relatively small geographic area permits the lottery in that anyone in the school district has reasonable access to the high schools. A similar lottery in a larger school districts would result in placing a much larger burden on students as they would have to travel farther.

Neighborhoods served by AISD include Alief, most of the New Chinatown, most of Westchase, Bellaire West, and most of Leawood and the Alief community center.

Notable alumni
Christopher Ayres, voice actor
Beyoncé, singer
Carmen Cusack, actress
Adaora Elonu, professional basketball player
Chinemelu Elonu, professional basketball player
Donovan Greer, professional football player
Jennifer Haley, playwright
Warrick Holdman, professional football player
Rashard Lewis, professional basketball player
Lizzo, singer
Rasika Mathur, comedian
Tobe Nwigwe, musician
Elliot Segal, disc jockey

References

External links

 
 
 Handbook of Alief Schools

Educational institutions established in 1975
Public high schools in Houston
Alief Independent School District high schools
1975 establishments in Texas